Jürgen Dommerich was an East German ski jumper.

Career
He set the first official hill record Letalnica bratov Gorišek in Planica on 21 March 1969 with 137 m (449 ft) long jump. Although Miro Oman from Yugoslavia as first person tested this hill two weeks earlier with 135 m (443 ft) long jump. After active career he worked as a trainer at WSV Benneckenstein ski jumping club.

References

External links

German male ski jumpers
20th-century births
Possibly living people
Year of birth missing